Rääbise Airfield was an airfield in Jõgeva County, Estonia.

The airfield was built between 1975 and 1985 by Soviet Union. The airfield was used for agricultural activities.

References

External links
 Rääbise Airfield at Forgotten Airfields

Defunct airports in Estonia
Buildings and structures in Jõgeva County